Carlos Reyes Gámiz (born 25 September 1969) is a Mexican politician. A Federal Deputy in the 62nd Legislature, he was later the candidate of the Solidarity Encounter Party for mayor of Miguel Hidalgo, Mexico City.

Career 
Subdelegate for Social Development in Miguel Hidalgo (1998–2000) 
Third Local Deputy, Legislative Assembly of the Federal District (2003–2006) 
 Candidate for Delegation Head in Miguel Hidalgo (2006) 
Secretary-General of the Party of the Democratic Revolution in the Federal District (2007–2008) 
 Coordinator of Metropolitan Affairs (2008) 
 Advisor to the Head of Delegation in Iztacalco (2010)  
Federal Deputy in the 62nd Legislature (2012–2015)  
 General Director of Revenue of the State of Michoacán (2016–2018)  
Director for Planning and Innovation (2018–2020)

References

External links
 https://libreenelsur.mx/busca-reyes-gamiz-tercera-opcion-miguel-hidalgo/

1969 births
Living people
Politicians from Mexico City
Members of the Chamber of Deputies (Mexico)
21st-century Mexican politicians
National Autonomous University of Mexico alumni